Adriano Guerra Strack (born 15 February 1992) is a Brazilian football midfielder playing with Ypiranga.

Career
Born in Carazinho, in the Brazilian state of Rio Grande do Sul, Adriano changed five Brazilian clubs, before he decided to go abroad. He played with the Grêmio youth team in 2007 and with Chapecoense in 2013. He joined NK Travnik in 2014. In nine appearances in the Premier League of Bosnia and Herzegovina, he scored five goals. Adriano helped save the club from relegation from 2013- 2014, Adriano left the Reserve Bank at start of interval was 2-0 to FK Borac Banja Luka Adriano made 1 goal gave an assistance and was fouled that led to the goal of facing 3-2. Adriano turned idol of Gerilla fans.

He had four caps for NK Dugopolje in the Croatian Second Football League, before he signed a three-year contract with Serbian SuperLiga club Novi Pazar in summer 2015.  However, unhappy with being a substitute in the first games of the season, on August 20, 2015, he and FK Novi Pazar reached an agreement to terminate the contract.  Thus Strack left Novi Pazar after playing only 9 minutes as a substitute in a game against Partizan in the third round of the SuperLiga. However, Strack left after less than two months.

He signed in 2016 with Mitra Kukar F.C. in Indonesia Soccer Championship, and had good performances in a short time. He returned to Brazil in April and to score that did pele, 75 meters from the goal distance, a friendly match between the team of his Clube Atlético Carazinho against Ypiranga Futebol Clube (Erechim) that participates in the Brasileirão series C.

Adriano signed with Ypiranga Futebol Clube (Erechim) team until the end of this year.

References

External links
 
 

1992 births
Living people
Association football midfielders
Brazilian footballers
Brazilian expatriate footballers
Brazilian expatriate sportspeople in Serbia
Expatriate footballers in Bosnia and Herzegovina
Brazilian expatriate sportspeople in Bosnia and Herzegovina
NK Travnik players
Expatriate footballers in Croatia
Brazilian expatriate sportspeople in Croatia
NK Dugopolje players
HNK Segesta players
Expatriate footballers in Serbia
FK Novi Pazar players
Serbian SuperLiga players
Mitra Kukar players
Expatriate footballers in Indonesia